Common names: burrowing vipers, burrowing asps, mole vipers, more.
Atractaspis is a genus of venomous snakes in the family Lamprophiidae. The genus is endemic to Africa and the Middle East. The genus contains 15 species that are recognized by ITIS. Others recognize as many as 21 species. 23 are listed here.

Common names
Common names for snakes of the genus Atractaspis include burrowing vipers, burrowing asps, mole vipers, stiletto snakes, side-stabbing snakes, side-stabbers. "Side stabbing" refers to the snakes' uncommon ability to strike with the side of their head and inject venom with one protruding fang.

Geographic range
Species of the genus Atractaspis are found mostly in Sub-Saharan Africa, with a limited distribution in the Jordan valley in Israel, Palestine and the Arabian Peninsula.

Description
Members of the genus Atractaspis share the following characteristics. Venom fangs enormously developed; a few teeth on the palatines, none on the pterygoids; mandibles edentulous anteriorly, with 2 or 3 very small teeth in the middle of the dentary bone. Postfrontal bone absent. Head small, not distinct from neck, covered with large symmetrical shields; nostril between 2 nasals; no loreal; eye minute, with round pupil. Body cylindrical; dorsal scales smooth, without apical pits, in 17 to 37 rows; ventrals rounded. Tail short; subcaudals either single or in two rows.

Species

*) A taxon author in parentheses indicates that the species was originally described in a genus other than Atractaspis.**) Not including the nominate subspecies.See also
 Snakebite

References

Further reading
Branch, Bill (2004). Field Guide to Snakes and other Reptiles of Southern Africa. Third Revised edition, Second impression. Sanibel Island, Florida: Ralph Curtis Books. 399 pp. . (Genus Atractaspis, pp. 61–62).
Smith A (1849). Illustrations of the Zoology of South Africa; Consisting Chiefly of Figures and Descriptions of the Objects of Natural History Collected during an Expedition into the Interior of South Africa, in the Years 1834, 1835, and 1836; Fitted out by "The Cape of Good Hope Association for Exploring Central Africa:" Together with a Summary of African Zoology, and an Inquiry into the Geographical Ranges of Species in that Quarter of the Globe. [Volume III. Reptilia]. London: Lords Commissioners of her Majesty's Treasury. (Smith, Elder and Co., printers). 48 plates + unnumbered pages of text. (Atractaspis'', new genus).

External links

 Stiletto snakes on Life is Short but Snakes are Long
Side-stabbing stiletto snakes on Tetrapod Zoology

Atractaspididae
Snake genera
Taxa named by Andrew Smith (zoologist)